Jandson dos Santos (born 16 September 1986), simply known as Jandson, is a Brazilian professional footballer who plays as a striker .

Honours

Club
Buriram united
Thai League Cup: 2015

Chiangrai United
 Thai FA Cup (1): 2017

References

External links
 Source from Toyota Thai Premier League Official Website 
 

1986 births
Living people
Brazilian footballers
Association football forwards
Saudi First Division League players
Saudi Professional League players
Najran SC players
Al-Qadsiah FC players
Khaleej FC players
Thai League 1 players
Buriram United F.C. players
Brazilian expatriate footballers
Expatriate footballers in Saudi Arabia
Expatriate footballers in Thailand
Brazilian expatriate sportspeople in Saudi Arabia
Sportspeople from Sergipe